Yassine Sekkoumi, known by his stage name Ali, originally Daddy Ali (born 1975) is a French rapper of Moroccan origin.

He started his music career with Booba as rap duo Lunatic and is now a solo rapper artist. For a certain time, he also used the stage name Africain Lié à l'Islam before deciding on using his mononym Ali.

After the split-up of Lunatic, Ali released his album Chaos et Harmonie in 2005, collaborating with 45 Scientific. In 2015, he released the album Que la paix soit sur vous.

Discography

Albums 
as part of Lunatic
2000: Mauvais œil
2006: Black Album

Solo

Appearances 
as Lunatic
1996: Le Crime Paie (Hostile Hip Hop)
1996: Time Bomb Explose (X-Men – "J'attaque du Mic")
1996: 16 rimes (La Brigade featuring Lunatic)
1997: Les Vrais Savent (L 432)
1998: Sang d'encre (Sang d'encre)

as Ali
1999: Ali in "Nique la halla" – in mixtape Opération coup de poing
1999: Ali feat Oxmo Puccino – Esprit mafieux
2002: Ali feat Suspects – Ennemis publics
2002: Booba feat Ali – Strass et paillettes in Booba album Temps mort
2003: Hi-Fi feat Ali & Nasme – "Le code de la rue" on Hi-Fi album Rien à perdre rien à prouver
2004: Ali feat Keydj – "Lamentations" in compilation album Sang d'encre haut débit
2008: Ali – "Dramatique" in Beni Snassen album Spleen & idéal
2008: Abd al Malik feat Ali – in "L'unique" on Beni Snassen album Spleen & idéal
2008: Ali feat Case Nègre – in "Soufre" in mixta
2011: Tha Trickaz feat Ali, Shabazz the Disciple – in "The night the earth cried" on Tha Trickas album Cloud Adventure
2013: Shtar Academy feat Ali – "R.A.P rien a prouver" on the music project Shtar Academy
2014: R.E.D.K. feat Ali – "Murderer" on R.E.D.K. solo album

References 

French rappers
Moroccan rappers
French people of Moroccan descent
1975 births
Living people
Rappers from Hauts-de-Seine